Behave may refer to:

 Behavior, the actions and mannerisms of organisms or systems
 "Behave" (Law & Order: Special Victims Unit), a television episode
 "Behave" (Benjamin Ingrosso song), 2018
 "(Someone's Always Telling You How To) Behave", a song by Chumbawamba, 1992
 "Behave", a song by Dupont, 2000
 "Behave", a song by Tired Lion from the album Dumb Days, 2017
 Behave: The Biology of Humans at Our Best and Worst, a 2017 book by Robert Sapolsky

See also
 JBehave, a Java behavior-driven development framework